Marana Unified School District (MUSD) is an above average, public school district located in Marana, AZ, comprising 17 schools in Pima County, Arizona. It has its headquarters in Marana. It has 12,293 students in grades PK, K-12 with a student-teacher ratio of 19 to 1, about 650 teachers. According to state test scores, 42% of students are at least proficient in math and 42% in reading. Founded in the early 1920s, MUSD's boundaries include  of land.

Schools
The Marana Unified School District has a total of 17 schools:
 10 elementary schools
 2 K-8 schools
 2 middle schools
 3 high schools.

Elementary schools
In alphabetical order:
 Butterfield Elementary (Casas Adobes Community Advocate, Casas Adobes)
 Coyote Trail Elementary (Marana)
 DeGrazia Elementary (Cortaro)
 Estes Elementary (Marana)
 Gladden Farms Elementary (Marana) 
 Ironwood Elementary (Casas Adobes Community Advocate, Casas Adobes)
 Picture Rocks Elementary (Picture Rocks),
 Quail Run Elementary (Casas Adobes Community Advocate, Cortaro)
 Rattlesnake Ridge Elementary (Marana),
 Roadrunner Elementary (Avra Valley),

K-8 schools
In alphabetical order:
 Dove Mountain (CSTEM) 
 Twin Peaks Elementary (Marana)

Middle schools
In alphabetical order:
 Marana Middle (Marana) 
 Tortolita Middle (Cortaro)

High schools
In alphabetical order:
 Marana High School (Marana),
 MCAT High School (Marana)
 Mountain View High School (Cortaro)

References

External links

 

School districts in Pima County, Arizona
1920s establishments in Arizona